The Bothriuridae are a family of scorpions, comprising 151 species in 16 genera.

The family has representatives in temperate and subtropical habitats from four continents: South America, Africa, Asia, and Australia. One genus (Cercophonius) has recently been discovered in the Himalayas.

The members of this family have a unique feature - the normally pentagonal sternum consists of two transverse bars (except Liposoma and Tehuankea) and is several times broader than long.

Genus and species 

Bothriurus Peters, 1861
Bothriurus araguayae Vellard, 1934
Bothriurus asper Pocock, 1893
Bothriurus bertae Abalos, 1955
Bothriurus bocki Kraepelin, 1911
Bothriurus bonariensis (C. L. Koch, 1842)
Bothriurus buecherli San Martín, 1934
Bothriurus burmeisteri Kraepelin, 1894
Bothriurus ceii Ojanguren Affilastro, 2007
Bothriurus cerradoensis Lourenço et al., 2004
Bothriurus chacoensis Maury & Acosta, 1993
Bothriurus chilensis (Molina, 1782)
Bothriurus cordubensis Acosta, 1955
Bothriurus coriaceus Pocock, 1893
Bothriurus dumayi (Cekalovic, 1974)
Bothriurus flavidus Kraepelin, 1911
Bothriurus guarani Maury, 1984
Bothriurus huincul Mattoni, 2007
Bothriurus illudens Mello-Leitão, 1947
Bothriurus inermis Maury, 1981
Bothriurus jesuita Ojanguren Affilastro, 2003
Bothriurus keyserlingi Pocock, 1893
Bothriurus maculatus Kraepelin, 1911
Bothriurus mochaensis Cekalovic, 1982
Bothriurus moojeni Mello-Leitão, 1945
Bothriurus nendai Ojanguren Affilastro & Garcia-Mauro, 2010
Bothriurus noa Maury, 1984
Bothriurus olaen Acosta, 1997
Bothriurus pampa Ojanguren Affilastro, 2002
Bothriurus patagonicus Maury, 1968
Bothriurus pichicuy Mattoni, 2002
Bothriurus picunche Mattoni, 2002
Bothriurus pora Mattoni & Acosta, 2005
Bothriurus prospicuus Mello-Leitão, 1932
Bothriurus rochai Mello-Leitão, 1932
Bothriurus rochensis San Martín, 1965
Bothriurus rubescens Mello-Leitão, 1947
Bothriurus sanctacrucis Mattoni, 2007
Bothriurus signatus Pocock, 1893
Bothriurus sooretamensis San Martín, 1966
Bothriurus trivittatus Werner, 1939
Bothriurus vachoni San Martín, 1968
Bothriurus vittatus (Guerin Meneville, 1838)
Bothriurus voyati Maury, 1973
Bothriurus ypsilon Mello-Leitão, 1935
Brachistosternus Pocock, 1893
Brachistosternus aconcagua Ojanguren Affilastro & Luisa-Scioscia, 2007
Brachistosternus alienus Lönnberg, 1898
Brachistosternus andinus Chamberlin, 1916
Brachistosternus angustimanus Ojanguren Affilastro & Roig Alsina, 2001
Brachistosternus artigasi Cekalovic, 1974
Brachistosternus castroi Mello-Leitão, 1940
Brachistosternus cekalovici Ojanguren Affilastro, 2005
Brachistosternus cepedai Ojanguren Affilastro et al., 2007
Brachistosternus chango Ojanguren Affilastro et al., 2007
Brachistosternus chilensis Kraepelin, 1911
Brachistosternus coquimbo Ojanguren Affilastro et al., 2007
Brachistosternus donosoi Cekalovic, 1974
Brachistosternus ehrenbergii (Gervais, 1841)
Brachistosternus ferrugineus (Thorell, 1876)
Brachistosternus galianoae Ojanguren Affilastro, 2002
Brachistosternus holmbergi Carbonell, 1923 [nomen dubium]
Brachistosternus intermedius Lönnberg, 1902
Brachistosternus kamanchaca Ojanguren Affilastro et al., 2007
Brachistosternus kovariki Ojanguren Affilastro, 2003
Brachistosternus mattonii Ojanguren Affilastro, 2005
Brachistosternus montanus Roig Alsina, 1977
Brachistosternus multidentatus Maury, 1984
Brachistosternus negrei Cekalovic, 1975
Brachistosternus ninapo Ochoa, 2004
Brachistosternus ochoai Ojanguren Affilastro, 2004
Brachistosternus paulae Ojanguren Affilastro, 2003
Brachistosternus pegnai Cekalovic, 1969
Brachistosternus pentheri Mello-Leitão, 1931
Brachistosternus perettii Ojanguren Affilastro & Mattoni, 2006
Brachistosternus peruvianus Toledo Piza, 1974
Brachistosternus piacentinii Ojanguren Affilastro, 2003
Brachistosternus prendini Ojanguren Affilastro, 2003
Brachistosternus quiscapata Ochoa & Acosta, 2002
Brachistosternus roigalsinai Ojanguren Affilastro, 2002
Brachistosternus sciosciae Ojanguren Affilastro, 2002
Brachistosternus simoneae Lourenço, 2000
Brachistosternus telteca Ojanguren Affilastro, 2000
Brachistosternus titicaca Ochoa & Acosta, 2002
Brachistosternus turpuq Ochoa, 2002
Brachistosternus weyenberghi (Thorell, 1876)
Brachistosternus zambrunoi Ojanguren Affilastro, 2002
Brandbergia Prendini, 2003
Brandbergia haringtoni Prendini, 2003
Brazilobothriurus Lourenço & Monod, 2000
Brazilobothriurus pantanalensis Lourenço & Monod, 2000
Centromachetes Lønnberg, 1897
Centromachetes obscurus Mello-Leitão, 1932
Centromachetes pocockii (Kraepelin, 1894)
Centromachetes titschaki (Werner, 1939)
Cercophonius Peters, 1861
Cercophonius granulosus Kraepelin, 1908
Cercophonius kershawi Glauert, 1930
Cercophonius michaelseni Kraepelin, 1908
Cercophonius queenslandae Acosta, 1990
Cercophonius squama (Gervais, 1843)
Cercophonius sulcatus Kraepelin, 1908
Lisposoma Lawrence, 1928
Lisposoma elegans Lawrence, 1928
Lisposoma joseehermana Lamoral, 1979
Orobothriurus Maury, 1975
Orobothriurus alticola (Pocock, 1899)
Orobothriurus ampay Ochoa & Acosta, 2003
Orobothriurus atiquipa Ochoa & Acosta, 2002
Orobothriurus calchaqui Ochoa et al., 2011
Orobothriurus compagnuccii Ochoa et al., 2011
Orobothriurus curvidigitus (Kraepelin, 1911)
Orobothriurus famatina Acosta & Ochoa, 2001
Orobothriurus grismadoi Ojanguren Affilastro et al., 2009
Orobothriurus huascaran Ochoa et al., 2011
Orobothriurus paessleri (Kraepelin, 1911)
Orobothriurus parvus Maury, 1975
Orobothriurus quewerukana Ochoa et al., 2011
Orobothriurus ramirezi Ochoa et al., 2011
Orobothriurus tamarugal Ochoa et al., 2011
Orobothriurus wawita Acosta & Ochoa, 2000
Pachakutej Ochoa, 2004
Pachakutej crassimanus (Maury, 1975)
Pachakutej inca (Maury, 1975)
Pachakutej iskay (Acosta & Ochoa, 2001)
Pachakutej juchuicha Ochoa, 2004
Pachakutej oscari Ochoa, 2004
Pachakutej peruvianus (Mello-Leitão, 1948)
Phoniocercus Pocock, 1893
Phoniocercus pictus Pocock, 1893
Phoniocercus sanmartini Cekalovic, 1968
Rumikiru Ojanguren-Affilastro et al., 2012
Rumikiru atacama Ojanguren-Affilastro et al., 2012
Rumikiru lourençoi (Ojanguren Affilastro, 2003)
Tehuankea Cekalovic, 1973
Tehuankea moyanoi Cekalovic, 1973
Thestylus Simon, 1880
Thestylus aurantiurus Yamaguti & Pinto-da-Rocha, 2003
Thestylus glasioui Bertkau, 1880
Thestylus signatus Mello-Leitão, 1931 [species inquirenda]
Timogenes Simon, 1880
Timogenes dorbignyi (Guérin Méneville, 1843)
Timogenes elegans (Mello-Leitão, 1931)
Timogenes haplochirus Maury & Roig Alsina, 1977
Timogenes mapuche Maury, 1975
Timogenes sumatranus Simon, 1880
Urophonius Pocock, 1893
Urophonius achalensis Abalos & Hominal, 1974
Urophonius brachycentrus (Thorell, 1876)
Urophonius eugenicus (Mello-Leitão, 1931)
Urophonius exochus (Penther, 1913)
Urophonius granulatus Pocock, 1898
Urophonius iheringi Pocock, 1893
Urophonius mahuidensis Maury, 1973
Urophonius martinezi Ojanguren Affilastro & Cheli, 2009
Urophonius mondacai Ojanguren Affilastro et al., 2011
Urophonius pizarroi Ojanguren Affilastro et al., 2010
Urophonius somuncura Acosta, 2003
Urophonius transandinus Acosta, 1998
Urophonius tregualemuensis Cekalovic, 1981
Urophonius tumbensis Cekalovic, 1981
Vachonia Abalos, 1954
Vachonia martinezi Abalos, 1954

References

 
Scorpion families